Kaneh Rashid-e Arab (also Romanized as Kaneh Rashīd-e ʿArab) is a village in Gurani Rural District, Gahvareh District, Dalahu County, Kermanshah Province, Iran. At the 2006 census, its population was 38, in 9 families.

References 

Populated places in Dalahu County